Trust in God is a studio album by soul singer Al Green, released in 1984. It is a collection of cover songs, performed in the style of gospel music.

Track listing
"Don't It Make You Wanna Go Home" (Joe South) - 3:07
"Up the Ladder to the Roof" (Vincent DiMirco) - 3:33
"Ain't No Mountain High Enough" (Nickolas Ashford, Valerie Simpson) - 2:23
"Trust in God" (Al Green, Johnny Brown) - 4:11
"No Not One" (Green) - 4:09
"Lean on Me" (Bill Withers) - 2:09
"Never Met Anybody Like You" (Green) - 2:52
"Holy Spirit" (Lindy Hearne) - 3:07
"Trust in God (Reprise)" (Green, Brown) - 1:33
"All We Need Is a Little More Love" (Green) - 3:32

Personnel 
 Al Green – lead and backing vocals, acoustic guitar, electric guitar, percussion, string arrangements
 Johnny Brown – Rhodes, organ
 Jesse Butler – Rhodes, acoustic piano, organ, synthesizers
 Jerry Peters – synthesizers
 Paul Zaleski – synthesizers
 Moses Dillard – electric guitar
 Mabon Hodges – electric guitar
 Gerard Minnies – electric guitar
 Reuben Fairfax, Jr. – bass
 Ray Griffin – bass
 Tim Dancy – drums, percussion
 Steve Potts – drums
 Paul Jordan – string arrangements
 Andrea Blackwood – backing vocals
 Candi Grant – backing vocals
 Jeanne Grant – backing vocals
 Bountiful Blessings Choir – backing vocals

Production 
 Producer – Paul Zaleski
 Executive Producer – Al Green 
 Engineers – Ron Dickerson, Al Green and Paul Zaleski.
 Mastered by Hank Williams at MasterMix (Nashville, TN).
 Art Direction – McConnell Graphics
 Photography – Mark Tucker

References

Al Green albums
1984 albums